"Bitterblue" is a song recorded by Welsh singer Bonnie Tyler for her eighth studio album of the same name (1991). It was released on 7 October 1991 by Hansa Records. The song was a European hit, missing the number one spot in Norway to Michael Jackson's song "Black or White". The song was written and produced by Dieter Bohlen.

"Bitterblue" has appeared on several of Tyler's compilation albums including The Very Best of Bonnie Tyler: Volume 1, Comeback: Single Collection '90–'94, Greatest Hits, Total Eclipse Anthology and Ravishing - The Best Of.

Composition 
"Bitterblue" was written and produced by Dieter Bohlen, who drew upon Rod Stewart's 1991 single "Rhythm of My Heart" for inspiration. The song features elements of Scottish folk music, including instruments such as bagpipes and accordion.

Chart performance 
"Bitterblue" was reasonably successful in Europe. In Norway, the song debuted at number 7, and remained in the Top 10 for sixteen weeks. It reached its peak of number 2 on its fourth charting week, maintaining this position for a second week behind Michael Jackson's "Black or White". "Bitterblue" spent a further six weeks at number 3.

The song also spent twenty weeks in the Top 30 Singles in Austria, where it peaked at number five. "Bitterblue" also spent 17 weeks in the German charts, where it reached number seventeen. The single was number 15 in Cash Box Pop Singles Looking Ahead,  this chart was equivalent to Billboard's Bubbling Under Hot 100.

Critical reception
Billboard gave the song a mixed review, stating, "bombastic production, with a rush of bagpipes and a choir of chirping children at the forefront, overpower Tyler's distinctive raspy voice."

Track listings

Maxi CD
"Bitterblue" (Radio Mix) — 3:48
"Bitterblue" (True Blue Mix) — 5:47
"Too Hot" — 3:26
"Whenever You Need Me" — 3:35

European 7" single
"Bitterblue" (Radio Mix) — 3:48
"Too Hot" — 3:26

German 12" single
"Bitterblue" (True Blue Mix) — 5:47
"Too Hot" — 3:26
"Bitterblue" (Radio Mix) — 3:48

Charts

Weekly charts

Year–end charts

Awards

RSH-GOLD Awards

References

Bibliography

 
 

Bonnie Tyler songs
1991 singles
Hansa Records singles
Songs written by Dieter Bohlen
Song recordings produced by Dieter Bohlen
1991 songs